Happy Phirr Bhag Jayegi is a 2018 Indian Hindi-language comedy film directed by Mudassar Aziz and produced by Aanand L. Rai and Krishika Lulla. The film is a sequel to the 2016 film Happy Bhag Jayegi. It stars Diana Penty as the eponymous character from the first film and Sonakshi Sinha as her namesake. The production features an ensemble cast consisting of Penty, Sinha, Jimmy Sheirgill, Piyush Mishra, Ali Fazal, and Jassi Gill. The film was released on 24 August 2018 to mixed reviews from critics.

Plot 

The film starts with Daman Singh Bagga and Usman Afridi being kidnapped by some Chinese goons and they're brought to Shanghai, China. Then the movie goes into a flashback. Happy and her husband Guddu go to Shanghai, China for a concert. A Botany professor, also named Happy, comes to Shanghai to join a university as a lecturer. At the airport the Chinese goons kidnap Happy 2 mistaking her for Happy 1. They take Happy 2 into custody and demand a contract as a ransom. The contract was actually given to Javed Ahmed and his son Bilal Ahmed, who was friend of Happy 1 shown in the previous movie. The contract was given to their rivals So, they kidnapped Happy 2 thinking she is Happy 1 and that she could convince Bilal to give them the contract and as soon as she does this they will release her. Happy 2 is unable make them believe that she is not that Happy they are looking for and that they have the wrong Happy. Chang, one of the goons does not believe her. Being left with no other options he abducts Bagga from his wedding ceremony in Amritsar and Usman from his farewell ceremony in Lahore. In the present moment in time. Chang tells Bagga and Afridi to convince Happy 2 to do what they want her to do and convince Bilal into handing over the contract to them. But they soon learn that Happy 2 has run away. Meanwhile, Happy 1 and Guddu reach the university and are told by authority  to join the orientation programme. Clueless, they join the orientation and roam around the city. Meanwhile, Happy 2 hides in a bar where she met Khushwant Singh Gill aka Khushi who works in the Indian embassy. She hides in his car. After which he sees her and listens to her story, at first Khushi is not willing  to help her but he finally agrees. He takes Happy 2 to his house. The next day, he takes her to his office to meet his boss Adnan Chow (Denzil Smith), a half Pakistani and half Chinese. Adnan assures Happy that he will help her. In the meantime, Chang find Happy's location and goes there with Bagga and Usman. Upon  reaching there, Chang orders them to catch Happy. But after seeing Happy 2, they get confused as she is not the Happy that they know they know. They then go to Khushi's house and Chang arrives there. Happy 2 hits Chang and he goes unconscious. Bagga and Usman decide to join Happy 2 and Khushi. They go to meet FAQ, Khushi's friend. They find out that Happy 2 came China not only to join the university, but also to find her eloped fiancée Aman Wadhwa who abandoned her two years ago. Happy 2 tells them that she does not want them involved in the situation causing them to get into trouble so she will look for her alone but Khushi and the other decide to help her anyway. They take Adnan's help in getting Aman's location only to find out that he does not live there anymore. Chang catches up with them and attacks them but they manage to escape. Khushi and Bagga Both start to fall for Happy 2 and challenge each other to see who can win her heart. FAQ meets Happy 1 and Guddu but does not recognise them. Happy 2 and the others find out that Chang works for Adnan and that Adnan was the mastermind behind this whole operation as he wants the contract from Bilal Ahmed. Happy 2 and the others also find out that Aman is in jail, so they plan to meet Aman in jail but end up getting caught. Upon being caught they explain the whole situation to the police they are released and finally go to meet Aman, upon arrival they see Aman dancing dressed as a female in front of the other prisoners and find out that Aman is gay and is living in jail just to be with his boyfriend. Happy 2 makes Aman realise his mistake and he agrees to apologize to her father about what he had done to her and her family. They all leave for Shanghai. Chang finally realises that Happy 2 is not the Happy that he was looking for. That night Chang kidnaps Happy 2 again with the help of Bagga and Usman who help him without realising as they are extremely drunk. The Next morning Khushi receives a call from Adnan who tells him he has kidnapped Happy2 to help him motivate himself into bringing him Happy1. Khushi goes to the others for helps, Bagga suggests that they arrange a concert to find Guddu. Aman takes responsibility to promote the event and FAQ arranges the concert. On they day of the concert Guddu and Happy 1 show up and they explain the situation to them. Guddu is not ready to help them but Happy 1 agrees as she believes that she is responsible for what's going on. Meanwhile, Happy 2 runs away from Adnan's custody. Unbeknownst to that Khushi and the others go to meet Adnan and his men. But Khushi understands what's going on an starts to run away along with Bagga, Usman, Guddu and Happy 1. Happy 2's Father finds out that Happy 2 has gone to China along with her cousins but has been missing for the past three days. Happy 2 finds Khushi and the others and follows them to catch Adnan and his gang they finally manage to catch them and hand them over to the police. Happy 2 and Khushi thank Happy 1 and Guddu for helping them. Happy 2 and Khushi are united and she finally meets her father. The movie ends in a scene showing Bagga flirting with Happy 2's cousins and everyone laughing.

Cast 
 Sonakshi Sinha as Harpreet "Happy" Kaur/Happy 2
 Diana Penty as Harpreet "Happy" Kaur/Happy 1 
 Jimmy Sheirgill as Daman Singh Bagga
 Ali Fazal as Gurdeep "Guddu" Singh
 Piyush Mishra as Usman Afridi
 Jassie Gill as Khushwant Gill
 Aparshakti Khurana as Aman Singh Wadhwa, Happy2's eloped groom
 Jason Tham as Chang
 Jeeveshu Ahluwalia as Fakkuruddin Qurashi "Fa Q"
 Bijou Thaangjam as Chinese Agent
 Denzil Smith as Adnan Chow
 Raja Bundela as Happy 2's father
 Sarah Hashmi as Gurleen, Happy 2's cousin sister
 Natasha Bharadwaj as Khushwant's mother
 Gaurav Dixit as Dimpy

Soundtrack 

The soundtrack of the film has been composed by Sohail Sen while the lyrics are written by Mudassar Aziz and Qamar Jalalabadi (noted). The song of the film, "Mera Naam Chin Chin Chu" from the 1958 film Haowrah Bridge originally sung by Geeta Dutt and composed by O. P. Nayyar has been recreated for this film by Sohail Sen in the voices of Sonakshi Sinha, Jassi Gill and Mudassar Aziz.

Release 
Happy Phirr Bhag Jayegi was released on 24 August 2018 to mixed response from film critics.

References

External links 
 
 

2018 films
Indian romantic comedy films
2010s Hindi-language films
Indian sequel films
2018 romantic comedy films
Films scored by Sohail Sen
Films set in Shanghai
Films set in China
Films shot in China
Films shot in Shanghai